is a Japanese actress, voice actress and novelist. She is represented by Aoni Production.

Mizusawa also announced that she was married on April 16, 2011 to a male non-actor.

Filmography

Anime television
Divergence Eve (2003), Kiri Mariarēte
Otogizōshi (2004), Minamoto no Hikaru
Misaki Chronicles ~Divergence Eve~ (2004), Kiri Mariarēte
Major 1st Season (2004), Majima
Eureka 7 (2005), Gidget, Linck
Futari wa Pretty Cure: Max Heart (2005), Miu Kagayama, Eternalun
Witchblade (2006), Nanako
Otogi-Jūshi Akazukin (2006), Mahō Gakkō Seito
Galaxy Angel Rune (2006), Satō-san, Tanaka-san, Suzuki-san
Coyote Ragtime Show (2006), Chris
Simoun (2006), Wapōrif
Chocotto Sister (2006), Yuki's mother
Tokyo Tribes (2006), Kei, Fujiwo
Fate/stay night (2006), Ayako Mitsuzuri
xxxHolic (2006), Fortune teller
Project Blue: Chikyū SOS (2006), Magī
Jigoku Shōjo Futakomori (2007), Ichiko Aida
Shinkyoku Sōkai Polyphonica (2007), Coccino Ruby Stilmane
Sky Girls (2007), Juria Kudō
Saint Beast: Kōin Jojishi Tenshi Tan (2007), Yōnen Tenshi
Darker than Black: Kuro no Keiyakusha (2007), Erika
You're Under Arrest: Full Throttle (2007), Ikki
Terra e... (2007), Toki
Tōka Gettan (2007), Mihashi
Higurashi no Naku Koro ni Kai (2007), Eriko
Romeo x Juliet (2007), Juliet Fiammata Arst De Capulet
Kyōran Kazoku Nikki (2008), Aichi Momokusa
Kemeko Deluxe! (2008), Ryōta Minamino
Nijū Mensō no Musume (2008), Angie
Bamboo Blade (2008), Aoki
Blassreiter (2008), Johann
Persona -trinity soul- (2008), Yumi Tasaka
Yakushiji Ryōko no Kaiki Jikenbo (2008), Matsumura
Kupū~!! Mamegoma! (2009), Yui Mamekawa
Kon'nichiwa Anne: Before Green Gables (2009), Mary Emerson
Ookiku Furikabutte ~Natsu no Taikai-hen~ (2010), Sakaeguchi's sister
HeartCatch PreCure! (2010), Erika Kurumi
Blue Exorcist (2011), Imai
Battle Spirits: Heroes (2011), Chihiro Kusaka
Freezing (2011), Elize Schmitz
Duel Masters Versus (2014), Lucifer
Marvel Disk Wars: The Avengers (2014), Virginia "Pepper" Potts
World Trigger (2014), Sakurako Taketomi
Mob Psycho 100 II (2019), Dash Granny
One Piece (2020), O-Cho

Anime film

Eureka Seven: Good Night, Sleep Tight, Young Lovers (?), Gidget, Linck
Hutch the Honeybee (?), Nyorori
Sword of the Stranger (?), Mokubō
Major: Yūjō no Winning Shot (?), Majima
Chocolate Underground (?), Smudger Moore
Tales of Vesperia: The First Strike (?), Chastel Aiheap
Pretty Cure All Stars DX2: Light of Hope – Protect the Rainbow Jewel! (?), Erika Kurumi
HeartCatch PreCure! the Movie: Fashion Show in the Flower Capital... Really?! (?), Erika Kurumi
Pretty Cure All Stars DX3: Deliver the Future! The Rainbow-Colored Flower That Connects the World (?), Erika Kurumi
Pretty Cure All Stars New Stage: Friends of the Future (?), Erika Kurumi
Pretty Cure All Stars New Stage 2: Friends of the Heart (?), Erika Kurumi
Pretty Cure All Stars New Stage 3: Eternal Friends (?), Erika Kurumi
Tropical-Rouge! Pretty Cure: Yuki no Princess to Kiseki no Yubiwa! (?), Erika Kurumi

Video games
100% Orange Juice! (?), Tomato
Atelier Ayesha: The Alchemist of Dusk (?), Regina Curtis
Bravely Default: Flying Fairy (?), Praline à la Mode, Egil Meyer
Bravely Second (?), Praline à la Mode
Fate/stay night [Realta Nua] (?), Ayako Mitsuzuri
Rune Factory Oceans (?), Sera, Knit

References

External links
 
 
 
Fumie Mizusawa at the Voice Artist Database 

1980 births
Living people
Aoni Production voice actors
Japanese stage actresses
Japanese video game actresses
Japanese voice actresses
Japanese women novelists
Sigma Seven voice actors
Voice actresses from Tochigi Prefecture